Rory Holden (born 23 August 1997) is a Northern Irish professional footballer who plays as a midfielder for  club Port Vale.

A Northern Ireland under-21 international, he began his career at Derry City, making his first-team debut in May 2016. He was sold to English club Bristol City in August 2017, and from there he was loaned out to Barrow and Rochdale in the 2018–19 season. He spent the 2019–20 campaign on loan at Walsall and joined the club on a permanent basis in August 2020. However he picked up a long-term knee injury four months later and missed much of the 2020–21 season and the entirety of the 2021–22 campaign. He joined Port Vale in July 2022.

Club career

Derry City
Holden began his career with Derry City, first joining as a 14-year old. He made his first-team debut on 29 May 2016 when he came on as an 81st-minute substitute for Keith Ward in a 2–0 win over Bray Wanderers at the Brandywell Stadium. He was given a three-year professional contract by manager Kenny Shiels. He earned his first start on 28 October, in a 2–0 victory at St Patrick's Athletic. Having featured four times in the 2016 season, he played another nine League of Ireland Premier Division games in the 2017 season, and scored his first senior goal in a 4–0 home win over Sligo Rovers on 9 July.

Bristol City
On 30 August 2017, Holden signed with English Championship club Bristol City after a successful trial spell. He had impressed manager Lee Johnson in two trials and the "Robins" agreed to a transfer-deadline day deal worth up to €300,000. However he never played a first-team game at Ashton Gate.

He joined Barrow on a one-month loan, starting on 14 September 2018. He played five National League games for Ian Evatt's "Bluebirds". He joined League Two club Rochdale on loan for the rest of the 2018–19 season on 3 January 2019. Manager Keith Hill said that "it's important we get players in who have the right mentality and who have the right game brain and intelligent energy, and Rory fits the bill". He played seven matches for Rochdale. He signed a new two-year contract with City in June 2019, with the club retaining a further 12-month option.

Walsall
On 26 July 2019, he joined League Two club Walsall on a season-long loan following a trial period. He made 36 appearances in the 2019–20 season, and though he played in a variety of positions he particularly impressed in an advanced midfield role. He scored his first goal in English football on 15 February 2020, with his 93rd-minute strike securing a 3–2 victory over Northampton Town at the Bescot Stadium.

On 11 August 2020, he re-joined Walsall on a permanent deal for an undisclosed fee. He made a good start to the 2020–21 season, playing on the right-wing and equalling his season-high goals tally of two by mid-October as the "Saddlers" put together a 12-game unbeaten run in the league. However he suffered a knee injury before a game at Salford City in December 2020, and though he made a brief return to action the following April in which he was described as a "a breath of fresh air" by interim head coach Brian Dutton, he would then suffer a further setback and was ruled out for the entirety of the 2021–22 campaign, with head coach Matt Taylor stating that he had to undergo another procedure after seeing "the best knee specialist in the country". He left Walsall upon the expiry of his contract in June 2022.

Port Vale
In June 2022, he began training with League One side Port Vale, who were managed by Darrell Clarke, Holden's former boss at Walsall. The club reportedly offered to pay his medical costs as he continued his recovery from long-term absence. Holden signed for Port Vale on 29 July 2022. He made his debut for the club the following day, though dropped out of the team in mid-August and would miss some weeks of the season due to a "minor setback" of an injury. He recovered and contributed with an assist during a 2–1 win over Barnsley in the EFL Trophy Round of 32 on 23 November.

International career
In 2018, Holden won three caps for the Northern Ireland under-21 team in victories against Luxembourg, Spain and Iceland; he scored the only goal of the game against Luxembourg.

Style of play
Holden is a left-footed midfielder with high energy and intelligence levels.

Career statistics

References

1997 births
Living people
Association footballers from Northern Ireland
Northern Ireland youth international footballers
Sportspeople from Derry (city)
Derry City F.C. players
Bristol City F.C. players
Barrow A.F.C. players
Rochdale A.F.C. players
Walsall F.C. players
Port Vale F.C. players
League of Ireland players
National League (English football) players
English Football League players
Association football midfielders